The Asclepiadoideae are a subfamily of plants in the family Apocynaceae. Formerly, they were treated as a separate family under the name Asclepiadaceae, e.g. by APG II, and known as the milkweed family.

They form a group of perennial herbs, twining shrubs, lianas or rarely trees but notably also contain a significant number of leafless stem succulents. The name comes from the type genus Asclepias (milkweeds).

There are 348 genera, with about 2,900 species. They are mainly located in the tropics to subtropics, especially in Africa and South America.

The florally advanced tribe Stapelieae within this family contains the relatively familiar stem succulent genera such as Huernia, Stapelia and Hoodia. They are remarkable for the complex mechanisms they have developed for pollination, which independently parallel the unrelated Orchidaceae, especially in the grouping of their pollen into pollinia. The fragrance from the flowers, often called "carrion", attracts flies. The flies pollinate the flowers.

Many new hybrids have been formed due to the unique fertilization method of the flowers.

Tribes and genera 

The following five tribes are recognised:

Asclepiadeae

Aidomene
Araujia
Asclepias
Aspidoglossum
Aspidonepsis
Astephanus
Barjonia
Blepharodon
Calciphila
Calotropis
Cordylogyne
Cynanchum
Diplolepis
Ditassa
Fanninia
Fischeria
Funastrum
Glossonema
Glossostelma
Gomphocarpus
Gonolobus
Graphistemma
Gyrostelma
Hemipogon
Holostemma
Hypolobus
Ibatia
Jobinia
Kanahia
Lachnostoma
Macroscepis
Mahawoa
Margaretta
Matelea
Merrillanthus
Metaplexis
Metastelma
Microloma
Minaria
Miraglossum
Monsanima
Morrenia
Nautonia
Nephradenia
Odontanthera
Odontostelma
Oncinema
Orthosia
Oxypetalum
Oxystelma
Pachycarpus
Parapodium
Pentacyphus
Pentarrhinum
Pentastelma
Pentatropis
Peplonia
Pergularia
Petalostelma
Phaeostemma
Pherotrichis
Philibertia
Pseudolachnostoma
Raphistemma
Rhyssostelma
Rhytidostemma
Rojasia
Schizoglossum
Schizostephanus
Schubertia
Scyphostelma
Seshagiria
Sichuania
Solenostemma
Stathmostelma
Stelmagonum
Stenomeria
Stenostelma
Tassadia
Trachycalymma
Tweedia
Tylodontia
Vincetoxicum
Widgrenia
Woodia
Xysmalobium

Ceropegieae

Anisotoma
Anomalluma
Apteranthes
Australluma
Baynesia
Boucerosia
Brachystelma
Caralluma
Caudanthera
Ceropegia
Conomitra
Desmidorchis
Duvalia
Duvaliandra
Echidnopsis
Edithcolea
Emplectanthus
Heterostemma
Hoodia
Huernia
Larryleachia
Lavrania
Leptadenia
Monolluma
Neoschumannia
Notechidnopsis
Ophionella
Orbea
Orbeanthus
Orthanthera
Pectinaria
Pentasachme
Piaranthus
Pseudolithos
Quaqua
Rhytidocaulon
Richtersveldia
Riocreuxia
Sisyranthus
Socotrella
Stapelia
Stapelianthus
Stapeliopsis
Tavaresia
Tridentea
Tromotriche
Whitesloanea

Eustegieae
Eustegia
Emicocarpus

Fockeeae
Cibirhiza
Fockea

Marsdenieae

Anatropanthus
Anisopus
Asterostemma
Campestigma
Cathetostemma
Cionura
Cosmostigma
Dischidia
Dolichopetalum
Gongronema
Gunnessia
Gymnema
Heynella
Hoya
Jasminanthes
Lygisma
Marsdenia
Oreosparte
Pycnorhachis
Rhyssolobium
Ruehssia
Sarcolobus
Stephanotis
Stigmatorhynchus
Telosma
Treutlera
Wattakaka

Genera now placed elsewhere
These genera are not accepted within Asclepiadoideae by Endress et al (2014), but many were recognized in Endress & Bruyns (2000).

Absolmsia
Clemensiella
Corollonema
Cyathostelma
Dactylostelma
Dalzielia
Decanema
Dischidanthus
Dittoceras
Dregea
Gymnemopsis
Huerniopsis
Kerbera
Leichardtia
Lhotzkyella
Macroditassa
Manothrix
Melinia
Microdactylon
Mitostigma
Oncostemma
Periglossum
Petopentia
Polystemma
Ptycanthera
Quisumbingia
Raphionacme
Rhyncharrhena
Schistogyne
Schistonema
Seutera 
Telminostelma
Tenaris
Tetraphysa
Trichosacme
Tylophora, syn. of Vincetoxicum
Vailia

References

External links

Stapeliads.info
Field Manual for Seed Collectors,Royal Botanic Gardens, Kew
Asclepiad info from ig-ascleps.org
Asclepiadaceae Family
The Genera of Asclepiadoideae, Secamonoideae and Periplocoideae (Apocynaceae)
Asclepiadaceae in BoDD – Botanical Dermatology Database

 
Gentianales subfamilies